Logunovium scortillum is a moth of the  family Erebidae. It was described by Wallengren in 1875. It is found in Angola, Cameroon, the Democratic Republic of Congo, Gabon, Lesotho, Malawi, Nigeria, South Africa and Zimbabwe.

Subspecies
Logunovium scortillum scortillum
Logunovium scortillum costalis (Kiriakoff, 1954) (Democratic Republic of Congo)

References

Spilosomina
Moths described in 1875